59E59 Theaters is a curated rental venue located in New York City that consists of three theater spaces or stages. It shows both off-Broadway (in Theater A) and off-off-Broadway plays (in Theaters B and C).  The complex is owned and operated by the Elysabeth Kleinhans Theatrical Foundation, a not-for-profit foundation.

History
The Elysabeth Kleinhans Theatrical Foundation was established by Founding Artistic Director, Elysabeth Kleinhans to create a new theater complex in East Midtown Manhattan.

In 2002, the building at 59 East 59th Street was donated to the Foundation. The building was then gut renovated, creating three new theaters, Theater A, Theater B, and Theater C, designed by architect, Leo Modrcin.

Under the leadership of Founding Artistic Director Elysabeth Kleinhans and Executive Producer Peter Tear, 59E59 Theaters opened its inaugural season in February 2004 with a production of The Stendhal Syndrome produced by then resident company, Primary Stages, in the largest of its three spaces, Theater A. Shortly following, in April 2004, the other two spaces, Theater B and Theater C opened their doors with productions of Sun Is Shining, by the ground breaking British-Chinese Mu Lan Theatre Company, and My Arm, Tim Crouch's critically-acclaimed hour-long solo show from the Edinburgh Festival Fringe, during the Theaters' first annual Brits Off Broadway—a season dedicated to premiering new work by Off Broadway-style UK companies. 

Since 2004, the theaters have been continuously occupied with shows running from three to seven weeks.

In 2017, Elysabeth Kleinhans and Peter Tear stepped down from their roles, and Val Day, a longtime agent with William Morris and ICM, was appointed as Artistic Director. With the addition of a new Artistic Director, 59E59 Theaters moved to the final phase of transitioning from the founding team to a traditional theater management structure, begun in 2012 with the appointment of Brian Beirne as Managing Director.

Recognition
In 2008, 59E59 Theaters was awarded a Drama Desk Award for Excellence in Theater.

Brits Off Broadway Season 
Brits Off Broadway is an annual Season showcasing work from the United Kingdom. The Season usually takes place during the months of April, May, and June and comprises between 6 and 8 productions across the three theater spaces. In 2006, Charles Isherwood of The New York Times hailed the festival as "a highlight of the theatrical year in New York." Past seasons have seen work by Richard Bean (One Man, Two Guvnors) and Alan Ayckbourn (The Norman Conquests, Bedroom Farce) amongst other notable British playwrights.

59E59 also hosts an annual festival called East to Edinburgh, a preview of new plays going to the Edinburgh Festival Fringe from North America.

References

External links
 59E59 Website
 Primary Stages Website
 

Theatres in Manhattan
Non-profit organizations based in New York City
Off-Broadway theaters
59th Street (Manhattan)